Yuryev, sometimes spelled as Yuriev, or Yuryeva/Yurieva (feminine; Юрьева), is a Russian last name that is derived from the male given name Yury and literally means Yury's. It may refer to:

People
 Alexei Yuryev (1887–?), a Russian Bolshevik
 Boris Yuryev (1889–1957), a Russian/Soviet scientist in the field of aerodynamics 
 Izabella Yurieva (1899–2000), Russian singer
 Mikhail Zakharyin-Yuryev, a Russian statesman and diplomat of the 16th century
 Nikita Romanovich Zakharyin-Yuriev, another name for Nikita Romanovich (died 1586), a Muscovite boyar 
 Vasili Yuryev (1955–2000), a Russian Internal Troops officer and Hero of Russia
 Vasili Yuryev (selectionist) (1879–1962), a Russian/Soviet selectionist and academician
 Yuri Yuryev (1872–1948), a Russian/Soviet actor and People's Artist of the USSR
 Timofey Yuriev (born 1973), a Russian/Soviet film director
 Yevgeny Yuryev (1951-2020), Soviet/Russian military officer

Places
 Yuryev, a former Russian name of Tartu, Estonia
 Yuryev, a former name of Bila Tserkva in Ukraine

Other
 Yuriev Monastery, a monastery in Velikiy Novgorod, Russia
 Yuryev reaction, a chemical reaction named after Soviet chemist Yu.K.Yuryev (1896-1965)

See also
 Yuryevsky
 Yuryev-Polsky (disambiguation)
 Yuri's Day (disambiguation) (Yuryev Day in Russian)